Silvana is a female given name. 

Silvana may also refer to:

Places
 Silvana, Iran
 Silvana, Washington

Plants
 Aspasia silvana
 Bifrenaria silvana
 Wittmackia silvana

Entertainment
 Silvana (opera), by Carl Maria von Weber
 Silvana (soundtrack), a soundtrack for the Mexican television series Cómplices Al Rescate
 Silvana, a battleship from the Japanese animated television series Last Exile

Other uses
 Silvana (food), a Filipino cookie
 Silvana*HDC, Dutch Warmblood show jumping mare
 , merchant ship built in Scotland in 1944 as Empire Captain

See also
 
 Sylvanas Windrunner, a fictional character in the Warcraft franchise and Heroes of the Storm
 Sylvana (disambiguation)